Glaro and Twabo are two largely mutually intelligible dialects of the Wèè languages which are divergent other. Ethnologue reports that Twabo (but not Glaro) has slight intelligibility with some dialects of Eastern Krahn.

References

Languages of Liberia
Wee languages